Thomas Charles Rickards (19 February 1915 — 1980), commonly known as Tex Rickards, was an English professional footballer who played as an outside forward.

Early life 
Rickards was born in Giltbrook, Nottinghamshire.

Career
Rickards began his career with Notts County, making over 100 appearances in all competitions for the club. He joined Cardiff City in 1938 as competition for Reg Pugh and played one season at Ninian Park before the put of World War II brought an end to his professional playing career.

After the war, he joined Peterborough United in the Midland Football League. Rickards scored 13 goals in 117 appearances for the club.

References

1915 births
1980 deaths
English footballers
Notts County F.C. players
Cardiff City F.C. players
Peterborough United F.C. players
English Football League players
Midland Football League players
Association football forwards